Supracondylar ridge may refer to:
 Lateral supracondylar ridge
 Medial supracondylar ridge